The 5th (Mhow) Division  was a regular division of the British Indian Army and part of the Southern Army which was formed in 1903 after Lord Kitchener was appointed Commander-in-Chief, India between 1902 and 1909. He instituted large-scale reforms, including merging the three armies of the Presidencies into a unified force and forming higher level formations, eight army divisions, and brigading Indian and British units. Following Kitchener's reforms, the British Indian Army was "the force recruited locally and permanently based in India, together with its expatriate British officers."

The Division remained in India on internal security duties during World War I, but some of its units were transferred to serve with other formations. The cavalry units formed the 5th (Mhow) Cavalry Brigade in the 1st Indian Cavalry Division and served in France and Egypt.

Formation 1914
Commanding General Major General Richard Lloyd Payne

Nasirabad Brigade
Commanding General Major General Davison
27th Light Cavalry
1st Btn Royal Irish Regiment
42nd Deoli Regiment
43rd Erinpura Regiment
44th Merwara Infantry
90th Punjabis
XIII Brigade, Royal Horse Artillery
XI Brigade, Royal Field Artillery
XIX Brigade, Royal Field Artillery

Jubbulpore Brigade
Commanding General, Major General Fanshawe
2nd Lancers (Gardner's Horse)
32nd Lancers
2nd Btn Cheshire Regiment
1st Btn York and Lancaster Regiment
2nd Btn East Yorkshire Regiment
16th Rajputs (The Lucknow Regiment)
63rd Palamcottah Light Infantry
97th Deccan Infantry
98th Infantry
Royal Garrison Artillery, 71 and 90 Companies

Jhansi Brigade
Commanding General, Major General Townshend
8th Lancers
38th Central Indian Horse
2nd Btn Royal Berkshire Regiment
10th Jats
99th Deccan Infantry
107th Pioneers
116th Mahrattas
Royal Garrison Artillery, 60 Company

Unbrigaded Units

14th King's Hussars
2nd Btn Hampshire Regiment
96th Berar Infantry
125th Napier's Rifles
VI Brigade RFA
XX Brigade RFA

See also

 List of Indian divisions in World War I

References

Bibliography

External links

British Indian Army divisions
Indian World War I divisions
Military units and formations established in 1903
Military units and formations disestablished in 1922
Mhow